The 1971 Richmond Spiders football team was an American football team that represented the University of Richmond as a member of the Southern Conference (SoCon) during the 1971 NCAA University Division football season. In their sixth season under head coach Frank Jones, Richmond compiled an 5–6 record, with a mark of 5–1 in conference play, finishing as SoCon co-champion. In the postseason, the Spiders lost to Toledo in the Tangerine Bowl.

Schedule

References

Richmond
Richmond Spiders football seasons
Southern Conference football champion seasons
Richmond Spiders football